Stefan Christian Holm (born 25 May 1976) is a retired Swedish high jumper. He won an Olympic gold medal, a silver in the World Championships, and one silver and one bronze medal in the European Championships. Clearing the bar 59 centimeters (23 in) over his own height, he currently holds the world record for height differential, held jointly with American Franklin Jacobs.

Holm is currently coach of Swedish high jumper Sofie Skoog.

Biography
His inspiration for high-jumping began when he was 8 years old. He saw a Swedish high-jumping legend, and former world-record holder, Patrik Sjöberg, compete on television.

In 2004, Holm won the 2004 Summer Olympics in Athens with a jump of 2.36 and was awarded the Svenska Dagbladet Gold Medal.

Holm finished 4th at the 2008 Summer Olympics with a leap of 2.32 m. On 13 September 2008 he announced his retirement from the sport. Holm ended his 20-year career with a second place at the World Athletics Final in Stuttgart.

He briefly returned to high jump competition in 2010 for a charity event: the Auto Lounge Comeback competition in Sweden. As his main rival Patrik Sjöberg had a knee injury, Holm agreed to jump off his wrong foot to even the score. He beat Sjöberg in the wrong-footed faceoff and went back to his normal takeoff to jump 2.15 m for third behind Ukhov and Donald Thomas.

He became an IOC member at the 125th IOC Session in Buenos Aires in September 2013. In October 2019, he announced he would leave his seat following the 2020 Summer Olympics.

On his 40th birthday in May 2016, Holm set a new Swedish veteran record for 40-year-olds (M40). With 2.06 m he broke the previous record of 2.05 m, which had been held by Egon Nilsson for almost 50 years.

Competition record

Other victories
1998: Berlin (IAAF Golden League-meet) - 2.28 m
1999: Lahti (European Cup first league) - 2.27 m; Stockholm (Grand Prix) - 2.29 m
2000: Gateshead (European cup super league) - 2.28 m
2001: Helsinki (Grand Prix) - 2.26 m; Vaasa (European cup first league) - 2.28 m; Brisbane (Goodwill Games) - 2.33 m
2002: Doha (Grand Prix) - 2.28 m; Seville (European cup first league) - 2.33 m; Zürich (Golden League-meet) - 2.35 m; Rieti (Grand Prix) - 2.29m; Paris (Grand Prix Final) - 2.31 m
2003: Lappeenranta (European cup first league) - 2.24 m; Rethymno (athletics meet) - 2.34 m; Gateshead (Grand Prix) - 2.30 m
2004: Bydgoszcz (European cup super league) - 2.32 m; Iraklio (Grand Prix) - 2.33 m; Internationales Hochsprung-Meeting Eberstadt) - 2.36 m; Stockholm (Grand Prix) - 2.33 m; Monaco (World Athletics Final) - 2.33 m
2005: Gävle (European cup first league) - 2.27 m; Paris Saint-Denis (Golden League) - 2.32 m; Stockholm (Grand Prix) - 2.33 m; Oslo (Golden League) - 2.29 m
2006: London (Grand Prix) - 2.34 m
2007: Vaasa (European cup first league) - 2.30 m; Lausanne (Grand Prix) - 2.28 m; London (Grand Prix) - 2.32 m; Stockholm (Grand Prix) - 2.35 m
2008: Istanbul (European cup first league) - 2.25 m; Athens (Grand Prix) - 2.37 m; Stockholm (Grand Prix) - 2.30 m

References

External links

Personal Home Page 
BBC Sports Article - (2004 Summer Olympics)

1976 births
Living people
People from Forshaga Municipality
Swedish male high jumpers
Olympic athletes of Sweden
Athletes (track and field) at the 2000 Summer Olympics
Athletes (track and field) at the 2004 Summer Olympics
Athletes (track and field) at the 2008 Summer Olympics
Olympic gold medalists for Sweden
Sommar (radio program) hosts
World Athletics Championships medalists
European Athletics Championships medalists
Medalists at the 2004 Summer Olympics
International Olympic Committee members
Olympic gold medalists in athletics (track and field)
Goodwill Games medalists in athletics
World Athletics Indoor Championships winners
Competitors at the 2001 Goodwill Games
Goodwill Games gold medalists in athletics
Sportspeople from Värmland County